Dap Dippin' with Sharon Jones and the Dap-Kings is the debut album by Sharon Jones & the Dap-Kings, released in 2002. It is also the first full-length release from Daptone Records.

Track listing

Personnel
 Sharon Jones – Vocals 
 Bosco Mann – Bass, Bandleader 
 Leon Michels – Tenor Saxophone
 Jack Zapata (Martin Perna) – Baritone Saxophone
 Binky Griptite – Guitar, Emcee
 Fernando Velez – Conga
 Earl Maxton (Victor Axelrod) – Organ
 Homer Steinweiss – Drums
 Anda Szilagyi – Trumpet
 Gabriel Roth – Producer

References

2002 debut albums
Sharon Jones & The Dap-Kings albums
Daptone Records albums